Alessandra da Silva (born 4 July 1974) is a Brazilian federal deputy. She is affiliated to Republicanos.

Born in Petrópolis, she is anti-communist and an ally of Conservative president Jair Bolsonaro.

References

External links 
 
 

Living people
1974 births
21st-century Brazilian women politicians
Republicans (Brazil) politicians
Members of the Chamber of Deputies (Brazil) from Minas Gerais
People from Petrópolis
Brazilian anti-communists